Simon Lambert may refer to:

 Simon Lambert (hurler), hurling player for Dublin and Ballyboden
 Simon Lambert (speedway rider) (born 1989), British speedway rider
 Simon Lambert (ice hockey)